Cantrainea jamsteci is a species of small sea snail with calcareous opercula, a marine gastropod mollusk in the family Colloniidae.

Distribution
This marine species occurs off Japan.

References

 Okutani T. & Fujikura K., 1990. A New Turbinid Gastropod Collected from the Warm Seep Site in the Minami-Ensei Knoll, West of the Amami-Oshima Island, Japan. Venus 49(2): 83-91

External links
 To Encyclopedia of Life
 To World Register of Marine Species

Colloniidae
Gastropods described in 1990